Brandon Ryder Cristina is an American Texas Country/Red Dirt singer from Carthage, Texas, United States.

Education
Cristina graduated from the University of Texas at Tyler with a degree in Industrial Technology.

Albums
Cristina released his first album, "Because She Loves Me" in May 2001.  His second album, "Behind the Pine Curtain", was released in 2003. His third album, "Conviction", was released in August 2005 and produced by Walt Wilkins.  This was the album that made heightened Brandon's stock in the Texas music scene. His fourth album, "Live" was released in 2007 on Nashville's Apex Records label.  This album produced his first number one single on the Texas Country Music Chart, "Before I Knew Your Name". His fifth album, "Every Night", was released in 2008 and produced by Radney Foster.  His sixth album, "Head Above Water", was released in February 2010 and produced by Walt Wilkins.

Brandon in February, 2010 celebrated his fast rising single, “Rock Angel,” which landed in the coveted No. 1 spot for two weeks in a row on both the Texas Music chart and the Texas Regional Radio. This song is the lead track from his new disc Head Above Water that was released nationwide on February 16, 2010 via Thirty Tigers. Album also includes a bonus DVD featuring an exclusive behind-the-scenes documentary about the making of this disc.

Booking
Brandon moved his booking to Red 11 in Nashville and released his fifth record in 2008 titled Every Night producer/co-writer Radney Foster. The record debuted at No. 53 on the Top Country Albums chart and at No. 50 on Billboard’s Top New Artist Albums chart. Every Night’s lead single, “This Ain’t It,” jumped to No. 5 on the Texas Music Chart and the accompanying video to "This Ain't It" was released in the summer of 2009. In May 2013, Cristina released his new hit single "Haggard" and has set a release date for August 2013 for his eighth album.

Top releases
To date, Brandon has delivered three Top 20 singles, two Top 10 singles, three Top 5 singles and now two No. 1 singles with “Rock Angel” and “Before I Knew Your Name.”

Discography

Albums

Music videos

References

External links
Official website

American country singer-songwriters
American male singer-songwriters
Country musicians from Texas
University of Texas at Tyler alumni
Singer-songwriters from Texas
Living people
Year of birth missing (living people)
People from Carthage, Texas